Serato (stylized in all lowercase) is a music software company.

History
Serato was founded in Auckland, New Zealand by Steve West and AJ Berstenshaw, who created software that changes the tempo of a recorded track without changing the pitch.

Software
Serato produces software used in digital music mixing, including digital vinyl record mixing for DVS records. Serato also produces software for DJ mixing, which has visual components including wave form beatmatching and other information about the sound being produced by the system. The software works with mainstream hardware, such as Roland, Denon, and Pioneer.

In 2018 Serato changed the names of its DJ software from Serato DJ to Serato DJ Pro, and from Serato DJ Intro to Serato DJ Lite. The new versions use 64-bit software architecture. Serato also partners with hardware developers such as Pioneer to create Serato controllers.

Pyro
Serato developed a mobile app called Pyro, which automatically fades songs from a mobile device as they transition from track to track without prompting, and serves as a playlist creator drawing music from a device’s iTunes library. Pyro also comes preloaded with other song collections curated by different artists and labels.

References

External links
Official site
Pyro app

Music software
DJ software
Companies based in Auckland
Software companies of New Zealand
New Zealand Media and Entertainment